State Road 185 (NM 185) is a  state highway in the US state of New Mexico. NM 185's southern terminus is at U.S. Route 70 (US 70) and the northern terminus of NM 188 in Las Cruces, and the northern terminus is at NM 26 in Hatch.

History
NM 185 was once part of a former routing of US 85.

Major intersections

See also

 List of state roads in New Mexico

References

External links

185
Transportation in Doña Ana County, New Mexico
U.S. Route 85